Goniaster is a genus of echinoderms belonging to the family Goniasteridae.

The species of this genus are found in Atlantic Ocean.

Species:

Goniaster marginatus 
Goniaster mulleri 
Goniaster scrobiculatus 
Goniaster stokesi 
Goniaster tessellatus

References

Goniasteridae
Asteroidea genera